Gabriele Binder is a costume designer based in Berlin. She is known for her work as the costume designer for The Queen's Gambit, for which she won the 2020 Costume Designers Guild Award for Excellence in Period Television.

References

Women costume designers
Year of birth missing (living people)
Living people